Thomas Edward Fairchild (December 25, 1912 – February 12, 2007) was an American lawyer and judge.  He served forty years as a judge of the United States Court of Appeals for the Seventh Circuit.  Earlier in his career he was a justice of the Wisconsin Supreme Court, United States Attorney for the Western District of Wisconsin, and the 31st Attorney General of Wisconsin.

Early life and career

Born on December 25, 1912, in Milwaukee, Wisconsin, he was the son of Edward T. Fairchild, who would serve on the Wisconsin Supreme Court from 1930 through 1957, and was chief justice for the last 3 years of his tenure.

Fairchild graduated from Riverside High School in 1929.  He obtained an Artium Baccalaureus degree from Cornell University in 1934, and a Bachelor of Laws in 1938 from the University of Wisconsin Law School.

In 1938, he entered private practice in Portage, Wisconsin, partnering with Daniel H. Grady.  In 1941, he was appointed a hearing commissioner for the Office of Price Administration in Chicago, Illinois, and Milwaukee, serving from 1941 to 1945. He returned to private practice in Milwaukee from 1945 to 1948.

Political career

In 1948, he became involved in a project to revitalize the Democratic Party in the state of Wisconsin.  At the time, Republicans had dominated state elections for the previous fifty years.  That year, Fairchild ran for Attorney General of Wisconsin.  The incumbent, Grover L. Broadfoot, was defeated in the Republican primary.  He had been appointed to the position to fill the unexpired term of John E. Martin, who had resigned to accept appointment to the Wisconsin Supreme Court.

Attorney General
Fairchild's Republican opponent in the election was Don Martin, who benefited from having the same last name as the previous five-term Attorney General John Martin.  Martin, however, did dispel some of that confusion when he was charged with public intoxication for an incident in which he urinated on a bank teller window in downtown Madison in broad daylight.  Fairchild went on to win the election, but he was the only Democrat to win state-wide office that year.  After the election, the incumbent, Grover Broadfoot, who was only serving on an appointed basis, resigned.  This cleared the way for Fairchild to be appointed to begin his term two months early.

As Attorney General, Fairchild was seen as pursuing policy that he believed in despite political consequences.  He fought for expansion of civil rights and equal protection under law.  Wisconsin did not have segregation laws like those that existed in the south at this time—in fact, Wisconsin had laws prohibiting the denial of equal enjoyment of public facilities—but there were still de facto segregation behaviors that Fairchild sought to challenge in the state.  For instance, the situation of the two public pools in Beloit, Wisconsin, where Fairchild brought a suit against the City Manager, A. D. Telfer, for the apparent segregation of those public facilities.  Fairchild dismissed the suit after securing sworn testimony from Telfer that African Americans would be welcomed at either public pool.

Fairchild boldly used his authority in other politically sensitive areas as well.  He issued an opinion finding that a then-popular Baseball tally card which awarded prizes based on scores was a form of illegal gambling; he asserted the right of the state government to set standards for counties administering benefits funded jointly by the state and federal government, where many counties were currently not meeting the standards; he supported Socialist Milwaukee Mayor Frank Zeidler's rent control rules; he opined that public school release for religious instruction of Catholic students was a violation of the Constitution of Wisconsin.  His most controversial decision, however, was his opinion finding that several radio and television programs which gave away prizes to the audience constituted a form of illegal gambling.

Federal office
In 1950, rather than running for re-election as Attorney General, Fairchild chose to challenge incumbent Republican United States Senator Alexander Wiley, who was seeking a third term.  He narrowly won the Democratic party's nomination, fending off Milwaukee Mayor Daniel Hoan, labor pick William Sanderson, and former Member of Congress LaVern Dilweg, who also happened to be a famous retired athlete who won three championships with the Green Bay Packers.  Fairchild ran on a liberal platform that endorsed Harry Truman's Fair Deal, advocating for expansion of Social Security to supplement or replace medical insurance and for the fair redistribution of income to prevent concentration of wealth in the hands of a small group of elites.  He also took an early stand against Wisconsin's junior senator, Joseph McCarthy, who had, that year, begun making accusations of communist infiltration of the United States government.  Fairchild said that McCarthy brought "shame to Wisconsin."

Despite his vigorous campaigning, Fairchild was defeated by the incumbent, Alexander Wiley, by about 80,000 votes. Nevertheless, his campaign had been noticed, and, in 1951, he was nominated by President Truman to become United States Attorney for the Western District of Wisconsin.  His opponent in 1950, Alexander Wiley, wrote a statement endorsing his nomination and he was confirmed by the Senate in March 1951.  He served briefly as a consultant for the Office of Price Stabilization in 1951 before his confirmation as U.S. Attorney.

In 1952, it was a priority of the Democratic Party of Wisconsin to defeat Senator Joseph McCarthy.  Several prominent Democrats considered running, including Gaylord Nelson, Jim Doyle Sr., and Henry S. Reuss.  Nelson and Doyle eventually bowed out of the contest in 1951, leaving Reuss, a previously unsuccessful candidate for Milwaukee Mayor and Wisconsin Attorney General.  A "Draft Fairchild" movement began among Wisconsin Democrats and, in July 1952, Fairchild bowed to pressure and resigned as U.S. Attorney to enter the U.S. Senate primary.  Reuss and Fairchild remained focused through the primary on campaigning against McCarthy, and, after a close race, Fairchild was chosen as the Democratic nominee.

The campaign to defeat McCarthy became a focus of attention from the national Democratic Party, as presidential candidate Adlai Stevenson and U.S. Senator Estes Kefauver visited the state to bolster Fairchild.  Fairchild's was one of the first Wisconsin campaigns to receive large contributions from out-of-state and one of the first to feature large scale radio and television advertisement.  Though Fairchild was considered soft-spoken, he was deeply critical of McCarthy's behavior in the Senate.  He said of McCarthy's tactics: "When we destroy a man's character, we take away from his dignity of soul. We take from him something that money cannot buy, something which may never be regained. When we stop and examine this spectacle, it revolts us."  Making up for Fairchild's lack of bombast, McCarthy was dogged by a Democratic "Truth Squad", composed of Gaylord Nelson, Jim Doyle Sr., and Henry Reuss, as well as Carl W. Thompson, Horace W. Wilkie, Miles McMillan, and Democratic gubernatorial candidate William Proxmire.

Despite diligent campaigning, strong Democratic support, and many Republican crossover votes, Fairchild was defeated by McCarthy.  McCarthy went onto his consequential second term, which saw him chair the Senate Government Affairs Committee and reach the height of his power.

Fairchild returned to private law practice, forming a partnership with Floyd Kops and Irv Charne in Milwaukee.  During this time, however, he remained active in public affairs and represented several Wisconsin citizens subpoenaed to testify before the House Un-American Activities Committee.

Wisconsin Supreme Court

In 1956, his father Edward, who was then Chief Justice of the Wisconsin Supreme Court, decided that he would retire at the end of his term in January, 1957.  Thomas Fairchild decided that he would run for the open seat.  In the Spring election, Fairchild won a commanding victory over William H. Dieterich and Clair L. Finch in the primary, with an even larger majority over Dieterich in the general election, taking over 77% of the vote.  He took office in January 1957, sworn in by his father.  He was re-elected without opposition in 1966, but would resign later that year to accept his seat on the United States Court of Appeals.

During his tenure on the Supreme Court, he was chair of the 1960 and 1963 Governor's commissions on constitutional revision.

Federal judicial service

Fairchild was nominated by President Lyndon B. Johnson on July 11, 1966, to a seat on the United States Court of Appeals for the Seventh Circuit vacated by Judge F. Ryan Duffy. He was confirmed by the United States Senate on August 10, 1966, and received his commission on August 11, 1966. He served as Chief Judge and as a member of the Judicial Conference of the United States from 1975 to 1981. He assumed senior status on August 31, 1981. His service terminated on February 12, 2007, due to his death.

Personal life and family

Fairchild's father was Chief Justice Edward T. Fairchild.  He met his future wife, Eleanor Dahl, when they were both students at the University of Wisconsin.  They were married in 1937 at Lowell, Indiana, where Eleanor had grown up.  Eleanor was active in supporting all of her husband's campaigns, but was especially active in the 1952 campaign against Joseph McCarthy.  They had four children together.

Fairchild died on February 12, 2007, in Madison, Wisconsin.  He was 94 years old.

Electoral history

Wisconsin Attorney General (1948)

| colspan="6" style="text-align:center;background-color: #e9e9e9;"| Primary Election, September 21, 1948

| colspan="6" style="text-align:center;background-color: #e9e9e9;"| General Election, November 2, 1948

U.S. Senate (1950, 1952)

| colspan="6" style="text-align:center;background-color: #e9e9e9;"| Primary Election, September 19, 1950

| colspan="6" style="text-align:center;background-color: #e9e9e9;"| General Election, November 7, 1950

| colspan="6" style="text-align:center;background-color: #e9e9e9;"| Primary Election, September 9, 1952

| colspan="6" style="text-align:center;background-color: #e9e9e9;"| General Election, November 4, 1952

Wisconsin Supreme Court (1956, 1966)

| colspan="6" style="text-align:center;background-color: #e9e9e9;"| Primary Election, March 6, 1956

| colspan="6" style="text-align:center;background-color: #e9e9e9;"| General Election, April 3, 1956

| colspan="6" style="text-align:center;background-color: #e9e9e9;"| General Election, April 5, 1966

References

External links
 

|-

|-

|-

|-

|-

1912 births
2007 deaths
20th-century American judges
Cornell University alumni
Deep Springs College alumni
Judges of the United States Court of Appeals for the Seventh Circuit
Justices of the Wisconsin Supreme Court
Lawyers from Milwaukee
People from Portage, Wisconsin
Politicians from Milwaukee
United States Attorneys for the Western District of Wisconsin
United States court of appeals judges appointed by Lyndon B. Johnson
University of Wisconsin Law School alumni
Wisconsin Attorneys General